The 1999 UEFA Women's Under-18 Championship was held between 3 August 1999 and 7 August 1999. It was the second edition of the UEFA European Women's Under-18 Championship. 27 teams competed in the preliminary rounds. Four teams qualified for the final stage of the tournament which consisted of a round-robin group stage. Sweden topped the group by having a better head-to-head record against Germany who finished level on points with Sweden. This was Sweden's first UEFA European Women's Under-18 Championship victory.

Group stage

References

External links

Tournament history page UEFA.com
Tournament and qualifying results. RSSSF.com

UEFA Women's Under-19 Championship
1999 in women's association football
1999 in youth association football
1998–99 in European football